Shams al-Dīn Muḥammad ibn ‘Abd al-Raḥmān al-Sakhāwī (1428/831 AH – 1497/902 AH) was a reputable Shafi‘i Muslim hadith scholar and historian who was born in Cairo. Al-Sakhawi" refers to the village of Sakha in Egypt, where his relatives belonged. He was a prolific writer that excelled in the knowledge of hadith, tafsir, literature, and history. His work was also anthropological. For example, in Egypt he recorded the marital history of 500 women, the largest sample on marriage in the Middle Ages, and found that at least a third of all women in the Mamluk Sultanate of Egypt and the Bilad al-Sham married more than once, with many marrying three or more times. According to al-Sakhawi, as many as three out of ten marriages in 15th century Cairo ended in divorce. His proficiency in hadith has its influences trace back heavily on his Shaykh al-Hafiz, ibn Hajar al-`Asqalani. He died in Medina.

Works 

 Al-Qawl Al Badee fi As Salat ala Al Habeeb Ash Shafi (incorrectly translated in english as Virtues and Etiquettes of Durud Sharif): about blessings of the Prophet.
 Al-Tuhfah al-latifah fi Tarikh al-Madinah al-Sharifah (التحفة اللطيفة في تاريخ المدينة الشريفة): About Madinah al-Munawwara.
 Fath al-Mugeeth bi Sharh Alfiyat al-Hadith (al-'Iraqi)
 Al-Daw' al-lami` li ahli al-Qarni al-Tasi Al-Jawahir wa al-Durar fi Tarjamat Shaykh al-Islam Ibn Hajar (al-Asqalani) (Pearls and Diamonds: the Biography of Shaykh al-Islam Ibn Hajar of `Asqalan)
 Al-Maqasid al-Hasanah Ashratu Sa'ah (Signs of the Day of Judgment) – which has been recently reprinted with 'Tahqiq' by Muhammad al-'Aqeel.
 Al-riḥlah al-Ḥalabīyah wa tarājimihā (الرحلة الحلبية وتراجمها)
 Al-riḥlah al-Makkīyah (الرحلة المكية)
 Al-riḥlah al-Sakandarīyah (الرحلة السكندرية)
 Al-baladaniyat  al-ʻalīyāt (البلدنيات العليات): A book where he recorded the names of 80 towns he visited and took knowledge from its scholars.
 Bughyat al-rāwī bi-man akhadha ʻanhu al-Sakhawi (بغية الراوي بمن أخذ عنه السخاوي) or Al-imtinān bi-shuyūkh Muhammad ibn `Abd al-Rahman'' (الامتنان بشيوخ محمد بن  عبد الرحمن): A dictionary that lists the names of all his teachers.

See also 
 List of Ash'aris and Maturidis

References 

Asharis
Shafi'is
Hadith scholars
Sunni imams
Egyptian imams
15th-century Egyptian historians
Egyptian historians of Islam
Egyptian theologians
15th-century jurists
1428 births
1497 deaths
Critics of Ibn Arabi